Enrique Ramiro Pujals is a Brazilian mathematician known for his contributions to the understanding of dynamical systems. Since fall of 2018, he has been a professor at the Graduate Center at the City University of New York.

Education
After earning an undergraduate degree in mathematics at the University of Buenos Aires in 1992, he became a Ph.D. student at the Instituto Nacional de Matemática Pura e Aplicada, where he was a student of Jacob Palis, completing his Ph.D. in 1996. He was a Guggenheim Fellow in 2000. Before moving to CUNY in 2018, he was a faculty member at IMPA since 2003.

Awards
He was an invited speaker at the International Congress of Mathematicians in Beijing 2002. Won the ICTP Ramanujan Prize (2008), UMALCA Prize in Mathematics (2004), TWAS Prize in Mathematics (2009), is a member of the Brazilian Academy of Sciences and receive the Brazilian National Order of Scientific Merit in 2013.

Selected publications
Pujals, E. R. ; Sambarino, M. "Homoclinic tangencies and hyperbolicity for surface diffeomorphisms". Annals of Mathematics, Princeton, v. 151, n. 3, pp. 961–1023, 2000.
Pujals, E. R. ; Sambarino, M. "On the dynamics of dominated splitting", Annals of Mathematics, Princeton, (169) (2009), 675–740.
Bonatti, C. ; Diaz, L. ; Pujals, E. R. "A C1-generic dichotomy for diffeomorphisms: Weak forms of hyperbolicity or infinitely many sinks or sources". Annals of Mathematics, Princeton, v. 158, pp. 355–418, 2003.
Morales, C.; Pacifico, M.J.; Pujals, E. R. Robust transitive singular sets for $3-flows are partially hyperbolic attractors or repellers, Annals of Mathematics, Princeton. 160, no 2, (2004), 375–432
S. Crovisier, E.R. Pujals, Essential hyperbolicity and homoclinic bifurcations: a dichotomy phenomenon/mechanism for diffeomorphisms, Inventiones Mathematicae, (2015) Volume 201, Issue 2, 385–517.
L. Diaz, E.R. Pujals, R. Ures, Partial hyperbolicity and robust transitivity, Acta Mathematica 183, no. 1 (1999), 1–43

References

Argentine mathematicians
Brazilian mathematicians
Year of birth missing (living people)
Living people
Dynamical systems theorists
Graduate Center, CUNY faculty
Instituto Nacional de Matemática Pura e Aplicada alumni
Instituto Nacional de Matemática Pura e Aplicada researchers
Expatriate academics in Brazil
TWAS laureates